Chris Walker (born 25 March 1972 in Nottingham) is a British motorcycle road racer and former scrambler with the nickname The Stalker. He is a four-time runner-up in the British Superbike Championship, and a former race winner in the Superbike World Championship. For the 2015 season Walker signed for Tommy Hill's Be Wiser Kawasaki Team aboard a Kawasaki ZX-10R in the British Superbike Championship, following his 2014 season with Lloyds British GBmoto squad. Team manager Hill left in August, 2015, and the team folded in September, leaving Walker without a ride for the final two race meetings of the season.

In early 2016, Walker announced he would no longer participate in superbikes, instead switching to the British Sidecar Championship, initially with a two-year contract. With no previous experience, Walker stated he was excited by the future opportunities.

Like Formula One legend Ayrton Senna, Walker developed Bell's Palsy in 2002 which paralysed part of his face. He lists his determination as his best feature, and his love of puddings as his worst. He usually races #9.
He returned to the grid in 2021 taking on the Ducati TriOptions Cup.

Early years and British Superbike Championship 1995–2000
Walker only started road racing in 1995 after many years as an accomplished motocross rider, but by the end of that year and into 1996 he rose through the ranks with ease and had ridden in Grands Prix and scored points.

In 1997 he challenged for the prestigious British Superbike championship with Yamaha, finishing as runner-up to experienced team-mate Niall Mackenzie. He switched to Kawasaki for 1998, winning in the season’s first race, before it became clear that the Yamahas of Mackenzie and Steve Hislop were the bikes to beat. Injury to Hislop allowed Walker to take 2nd in the series again, a feat he repeated behind Troy Bayliss’ Ducati in 1999.

He came agonisingly close to the 2000 title, when an engine failure in his Suzuki took him out of a winning position with just three laps remaining of the final race at Donington Park, leaving Walker in tears and gifting the title to GSE Ducati’s Neil Hodgson. He did however take a second place at Brands Hatch in the World Superbike round that year, the best of his many wild card entries in the UK rounds (and occasionally Assen in the Netherlands) over the years.

500 cc World Championship 2001 and World Superbikes 2002–2006
Walker made an attempt at the 500 cc World Championship in 2001. He predicted that "For me it's going to be the toughest year ever", which proved accurate, as the factory Shell-sponsored Honda was hard to ride and forced Walker to override, resulting in many huge crashes. In , he moved to the Superbike World Championship, initially with the Fuchs Kawasaki team.

In , he joined the PSG-1 Kawasaki Corse team, proving to be the most consistent Kawasaki rider in terms of pace and results, securing one podium finish (3rd place, round 6 at Valencia) and finishing 7th place overall.

 saw Walker teamed up with Frenchman Régis Laconi and Spain's Fonsi Nieto on a Kawasaki Europe backed ZX-10R for PSG. Walker secured his maiden Superbike World Championship race win on 3 September 2006 in Race 1 at Assen, Netherlands in his 131st race. Starting the race in 13th position, and dropping to 26th position at the first corner following an excursion onto the grass, Walker braved the torrential rain and a high rate of attrition to win in a time of 44 minutes, 23.501 seconds. He came 9th overall in the championship, 19 points ahead of Nieto as the highest Kawasaki.

Despite his finishing position, Walker was subsequently dropped by PSG for the  season, while Kawasaki still supported PSG as an official factory team.

Return to the British Superbike Championship 2007

Walker initially struggled on the Rizla Suzuki in the British Superbike championship, occasionally outpaced by rookie team-mate Cal Crutchlow. When Neil Hodgson tested the bike some speculated that Walker's ride was under threat. The team insisted it wasn't, and at Oulton Park he took third in race one, in tricky conditions which saw many top riders (such as Jonathan Rea, Gregorio Lavilla and Tom Sykes) crash out. This was only his second podium of the season. His points tally for the year was 225, comparing favourably to his team-mate's 152.

World Supersport 2008
However, the bike was not competitive, and he switched to the Paul Bird VK Vent-Axia team in World Superbikes for the final five rounds of the season. He opened with minor points at Brands Hatch, but crashed twice at Donington Park.

British Superbike Championship 2009–2013
For 2009 he was optimistic of a top British Superbike Championship ride, as all the established good riders are gone. He ultimately joined the Henderson Yamaha team, but struggled for much of the year. He was competitive in race 1 at Mallory Park until chaos and controversy struck. He was running second when Josh Brookes lost control of his bike and catapulted race leader Simon Andrews, dropping oil from Brookes' Honda. Walker was one of five other riders who either crashed or downed their bikes to avoid crashing. The red flag was shown, but these seven riders were excluded from the results, due to an unexpected application of the rules. Brookes received a two-race ban for his mistake.

For 2010 Walker was released by the Motorpoint Henderson Yamaha. It looked like he would not be racing in 2010, but he arranged a deal wirh  on a privately run Suzuki tuned by former BSB rider Ray Stringer just a week before the opening round. After 2 races Walker was offered a ride in the MSS Kawasaki team when Simon Andrews was injured in a crash while guesting in World Superbikes. He returned to the Suzuki once Andrews was fit again, but raced for SMT Honda at Snetterton, scoring the team's best 2010 results of two sevenths and an eleventh in the process

During 2011 and 2012 Walker rode for Pr1mo Bournemouth Kawasaki, and for 2013 he rode with Quattro Plant Kawasaki.

British Superbike Championship 2014 and 2015
After a season with Lloyds British GBmoto on a Kawasaki ZX-10R, for 2015 Walker changed to Be Wiser Kawasaki Team, again riding a ZX-10R, for a team owned by Alan Greig, having Be Wiser Insurance as main sponsor and part-sponsored by Dickies industrial clothing.

As the oldest rider competing in British Superbikes, Walker's extensive experience with superbike machines and Kawasaki makes him ideal as lead-rider to develop the new squad, partnered by Danny Buchan, fresh from his 2014 success as Pirelli National Superstock 1000 Champion.

Former BSB rider and 2012 Champion Tommy Hill was team-manager, making his return to racing after three years' absence developing his graphic design business. Hill left in August, 2015, and the team folded in September, leaving Walker without a ride for the final two race meetings of the season.

British Sidecar Championship 2016
Walker competed in the 2016 British Sidecar Championship with 2012 World Sidecar Champion passenger Ashley Hawes in the chair. With over 6 podium finishes already this year and a 100% race finish record, Chris and Ashley lie a comfortable 4th in the championship with only 4 races remaining.

British Superbike Championship 2017  
According to an article by Oli Rushby on Motorcycle News.com, Chris Walker sustained injuries during the "eight round of the 2017 MCE British Superbike Championship at Cadwell Park after a nasty crash in Friday’s Sidecar session." Rushby went on to report that "[t]he multiple BSB runner-up crashed his Kawasaki-powered Santander Salt outfit at Mansfield and was taken to hospital with suspected back injuries", before being "confirmed he sustained a break to his T4 vertebrae... as well as a broken nose."

2019 
Walker is planning on participating in the Hyundai Construction British Sidecar Championship with TAG Racing with the support of team-mate Tom Christie.

Personal life
Chris' father John was the proprietor of John Walker Superbikes, a retail motorcycle dealership in Langley Mill, Nottingham, which also owned Fox's Kawasaki in Mapperley, Nottingham, and Wraggs Motorcycles in Mansfield.

Chris Walker lives in Ollerton, Nottinghamshire, and also runs a Ducati & Kawasaki dealership Chris Walker Motorcycles in Grantham www.chriswalkermotorcycles.com

Career statistics
Stats correct as of 9 July 2012

By championship

British Superbike Championship

Superbike World Championship

Supersport World Championship

References

External links
 Personal Website
Column by Chris Walker from 2002
Chris Walker full profile

1972 births
Living people
Sport in Nottingham
Sportspeople from Nottingham
British motorcycle racers
English motorcycle racers
British Superbike Championship riders
Superbike World Championship riders
500cc World Championship riders
250cc World Championship riders
Supersport World Championship riders
People from Ollerton
Sportspeople from Nottinghamshire